Angelo F. Orazio (June 19, 1926 – January 22, 2018) was a Democratic American politician who served in the New York State Assembly from the 15th district from 1975 to 1984. He was elected by defeating the Assembly's Majority Leader, John E. Kingston in 1974, a year when the fallout from Watergate brought down many Republicans nationwide. He was defeated by Dan Frisa after 10 years in the legislature.

He lost a race for the State Senate to Michael J. Tully Jr. in 1986.

He died on January 22, 2018, in Albertson, New York at age 91.

References

1926 births
2018 deaths
Democratic Party members of the New York State Assembly